Jeremias "Jerry" Elizalde Navarro (22 May 1924 – 10 June 1999) was a Filipino artist.

Early life and education
As a young artist, Navarro was very passionate in creating new ways of art. He experimented with different kinds of art media such as oil, acrylic, and watercolor. He also tried making sculpture and mixed media. He uses the "incision painting" this method is applied on the stop surface by carving out the artist’s desired pattern on the stone materials and layering paint or plaster on the stone surface.

He studied in the University of the Philippines, Manila as a Ramon Roces Publication Scholar in 1947. The following year he transferred to the University of Santo Tomas, he studied fine arts with a major in painting. He graduated with a Bachelor of Arts in 1951. While studying at the university he was also an art editor for the university newspaper The Varsitarian.

Personal life 
His wife is sculptor Virginia Ty-Navarro.

Exhibits and works
1967 – represented the Philippines in Sculpture Category, São Paulo Beinnale Brazil
1970 – represented the Philippines in Sculpture Category, São Paulo Beinnale, Brazil
1972 – represented the Philippines at the Biennale de art Graphiques, Brno, Czechoslovakia
1977 – designed the Philippine booth, 12th Tokyo International Trade Fair Japan
1977 – designed the ASEAN Trade Fair, Manila, Philippines
1980 – First Filipino artist to be represented at YAYASAN Bali, Indonesia 
2014 – Leon Art Gallery Auction House "The Kingly Treasures"

See also
Virginia Ty-Navarro

References

1924 births
Karay-a people
University of the Philippines Manila alumni
University of Santo Tomas alumni
Filipino artists
1999 deaths